Matoatoa is a small genus of geckos, lizards in the family Gekkonidae. The genus is endemic to Madagascar.

Species
There are two recognized species:
Matoatoa brevipes 
Matoatoa spannringi 

Nota bene: A binomial authority in parentheses indicates that the species was originally described in a genus other than Matoatoa.

References

Further reading
Heinicke MP, Daza JD, Greenbaum E, Jackman TR, Bauer AM (2014). "Phylogeny, taxonomy and biogeography of a circum-Indian Ocean clade of leaf-toed geckos (Reptilia: Gekkota), with a description of two new genera". Systematics and Biodiversity 12 (1): 23–42.
Nussbaum RA, Raxworthy CJ, Pronk O (1998). "The Ghost Geckos of Madagascar: A Further Revision of the Malagasy Leaf-toed Geckos (Reptilia, Squamata, Gekkonidae)". Miscellaneous Publications, Museum of Zoology, University of Michigan (186): 1-26. (Matoatoa, new genus, p. 2; M. spannringi, new species, p. 12).

 
Reptiles of Madagascar
Endemic fauna of Madagascar
Lizard genera